The men's individual horizontal bar competition of the 2014 Commonwealth Games took place on August 1 at the SSE Hydro arena in Glasgow, Scotland.

Results

Qualification

Qualification took place on July 29 as part of the team and individual qualification event.

Final

Although both received the same total score, Nile Wilson was awarded the gold medal over Kristian Thomas based on his higher execution score.

References

External links
Official results

Gymnastics at the 2014 Commonwealth Games